Popcorn is a 1991 American slasher film directed by Mark Herrier and written by Alan Ormsby. It stars Jill Schoelen, Tom Villard, Tony Roberts, Dee Wallace, and Derek Rydall.

Plot 
Film student and aspiring screenwriter Maggie Butler has recurring dreams of a young girl named Sarah who is caught in a fire and being chased by a strange man who is trying to kill her. She records what she remembers on an audiotape and plans on making the story into a film. Maggie lives with her mother Suzanne, who has been receiving demonic prank calls. On her way to class, Maggie shuns the advances of her boyfriend Mark, explaining that she can't be distracted from writing her script.

Maggie's classmate Toby D'Amato has an idea to put on an all-night horror movie marathon to raise funds for the university's film department. They set up shop in the defunct Dreamland theater, which is to be razed in three weeks. Professor Davis is concerned about the time constraints, but Toby enlists the help of Dr. Mnesyne, an owner of a film memorabilia shop, with deploying promotional gimmicks. There are three main films within a film: Mosquito is a 3D film, The Attack of the Amazing Electrified Man uses a "Shock-o-Scope" gimmick (electrical "buzzers" in seats), and The Stench uses Odorama.

As they go through Dr. Mnesyne's trunks of equipment, they find a short cult film called Possessor, which greatly resembles Maggie's dreams. Davis informs them Lanyard Gates, the film's director, killed his own family while shooting the final scene before setting the theater on fire, trapping the audience inside. Maggie soon becomes obsessed with Possessor and tries to figure out why she has been dreaming about it. When she asks her mother if she has heard of Gates or Possessor, Suzanne becomes uncomfortable; she urges Maggie to quit the festival and wants them to go away together. After Maggie goes to bed, Suzanne receives another prank call from someone she believes to be Gates. He tells her to meet him at Dreamland so they can talk and advises her to bring a gun.

On the night of the festival, Maggie is working the box office when Mark arrives with another girl, Joy. Later, a man buys a ticket and calls Maggie "Sarah" before he walks away. Unable to find the man in the theater, Maggie goes to the projection booth to tell Toby that she thinks she saw Gates. Meanwhile, Mark has left his date to sneak up on Maggie and Davis prepares the giant mosquito model to fly across the theater that he operates with a remote control. Once the mosquito is released above the audience, a figure in the catwalks above Davis, using another remote control, uses the mosquito to stab Davis in the chest with the stinger. The scene cuts to a laboratory where a figure is seen making a mask of Davis's face.

As the second film starts, Bud, who is a wheelchair-user, prepares the seat shockers from a control panel above the audience. Maggie listens to her audio recordings when the tape is cut off with a message from Gates. As she tries to exit the box office, she opens the door on Mark, knocking him down and unknowingly smashing the recorder in the process. Meanwhile, Maggie's classmate Tina finds Davis on the catwalk and goes up to meet him; it is revealed that they have been having an affair. She is unaware that the killer is posing as the professor and is strangled with rope. Mark and Maggie find her shortly thereafter, but the killer manipulates her voice and body in the darkness to make it look like she is still alive.

The killer straps Bud into a makeshift electric chair that is set to go off when a series of lights comes on. As he is electrocuted, the theater loses power. Maggie finds her way to Bud, only to find him dead and Gates confronting her. As Maggie flees, she realizes that she is Sarah Gates, Lanyard is her father, and Suzanne is her aunt who saved her from being killed so long ago. She runs into Toby and tells him everything she remembers, believing that Gates has returned for her. She and Toby enter the basement and Toby falls, disappearing into the darkness. With only a flashlight, Maggie thinks she sees Davis and Tina, but runs into Gates. The power comes back on and Maggie finds herself in the killer's lair, strapped into the chair he uses to make facial masks of his victims.

The killer is revealed to be Toby, who was badly burned as a child after attending the showing of Possessor with his mother. Toby's mother was a member of Gates' film cult and was killed in the fire. Toby holds Maggie and Suzanne responsible for his loss and plans to exact his revenge on them by re-enacting the final scene of Possessor onstage that evening, only with the ending that Gates had originally intended. He then wheels out Suzanne, whom he has cast full-body, pointing her gun.

Meanwhile, Cheryl and Joanie tend to Mark's injuries as they are met with an upset Joy, who tells Mark she saw Maggie and Toby together and that they went back to Toby's place. Mark leaves to find them and Joanie realizes she is late for her Odorama cue and goes to join Leon to activate the odor pellets during the third film. Leon leaves to go to the bathroom and is met by a mirror image of himself at the next urinal. After urinating on him, the doppelganger attacks Leon and locks him in one of the stalls and drops some type of material into the toilet that creates a thick smoke and Leon passes out. Soon after, there is an explosion from the stall and Leon is killed. Toby returns to the booth dressed as Leon with the plan to stab Joanie from behind, but spares her when she mentions her unrequited love for Toby. Shocked by this, Toby gets upset and storms out to continue setting up for the final scene of Possessor.

Mark arrives at Toby's apartment to find that the landlord is evicting Toby. Toby's walls are plastered with articles concerning the incident, pictures of his facial reconstruction, and pictures of Maggie with scissors through her eyes. Realizing she is in real danger, Mark rushes back to the theater but the front doors are locked. He scales the building, climbs through a window on the balcony level and finds the final scene of Possessor playing on stage. Maggie has been drugged and placed in a metal dress, so she has no mobility except for her head. She pleads to the audience to save her, but they believe this is all part of the show. Mark uses his belt on the mosquito track and zip-lines onto the stage, causing the secured mosquito to unlatch and swing out across the stage. The stinger stabs Toby in the chest, killing him. Mark releases Maggie and Suzanne as the crowd erupts in applause.

Cast 
 Jill Schoelen as Maggie
 Tom Villard as Toby
 Dee Wallace as Suzanne
 Derek Rydall as Mark
 Malcolm Danare as Bud
 Kelly Jo Minter as Cheryl
 Ivette Soler as Joanie
 Elliott Hurst as Leon
 Freddie Marie Simpson as Tina
 Tony Roberts as Mr. Davis
 Ray Walston as Dr. Mnesyne
 Barry Jenner as Lt. Bradley
 Cindy Breakspeare as Gloria Gates

Production 
Adamant about not directing another horror film after Black Christmas, Bob Clark passed on the offer to helm the film and instead suggested Alan Ormsby, his Deathdream collaborator instead. Popcorn was filmed entirely in Kingston, Jamaica.  Ormsby was replaced by Porky's actor Mark Herrier a few weeks into filming. The cast and crew speculated that Ormsby was fired for being too "detailed oriented" in the filming of the marathon films. The original lead Amy O'Neill was replaced by Jill Schoelen at this time as well. Clark, an uncredited producer on the film, also acted as a "hands-on" filmmaker throughout production and served as a second unit director when needed.

Ormsby is credited with directing all three of the main films within a film, while Herrier is credited with filming the present-day portions of the film.

Analysis 
According to John Kenneth Muir, the title reflects a trend in the horror films of the 1990s. There were few colorful titles, none as flamboyant as examples of previous decades such as The Last House on the Left (1972), The Texas Chain Saw Massacre (1974), and A Nightmare on Elm Street (1984). Instead, most film titles were generic and simple. Besides Popcorn, he cites titles such as The Guardian (1990), The Crush (1993), The Temp (1993), Hideaway (1995), and Scream (1996). He believes this trend was a result of the studio desire for generic, wide-appeal films.

Muir believes the film itself was part of another trend of the time. Horror films which were both postmodernist films and self-reflective. Popcorn took inspiration from the history of the horror films, from the 1950s onwards, inspiring films like Wes Craven's New Nightmare (1994) and In the Mouth of Madness (1995) which used metafiction as one of their themes.

Muir found the films-within-a-film to be more interesting than the frame story. He found them to be a realistic homage to the low-budget horror film of the 1950s and to the gimmicks of William Castle. Mosquito has similarities to the films of Jack Arnold. Nuclear weapons testing has caused desert mosquitoes to grow into giant monsters, in a plot resembling Them! (1954) and The Deadly Mantis (1957). The film includes stock characters and situations, such as a dedicated lady scientist and the military insisting on using a nuclear weapon to annihilate the monster. The gimmick accompanying Mosquito is a life-sized version of the giant mosquito which slides down a rope above the heads of the film audience. This is a tribute to Emergo, the Castle-devised gimmick accompanying House on Haunted Hill (1959). The original gimmick featured a glowing skeleton sliding down a rope. The title of The Attack of the Amazing Electrified Man seems to be a homage to The Amazing Colossal Man (1957), while the visual style of this film is similar to the works of William Cameron Menzies. It includes influences from German Expressionism, with "exaggerated shadows and menacing low-angles". The accompanying gimmick, "Shock-o-Scope", seems to be a rename of Percepto, the electric gimmick which accompanied The Tingler (1959). The Stench is fashioned after Japanese films, imported and dubbed for the American market. Its accompanying gimmick is an obvious variation of Smell-O-Vision, the gimmick used in Scent of Mystery (1960). Stranger than them is the Possessor. It features extreme close-ups, and functions as a mix between a snuff film and a product of Psychedelia. Its protagonist Lanyard Gates has similarities to cult leader Charles Manson.

The frame story is instead a rather typical slasher film. The killer impersonates his victims through use of masks, and his goal is the performance of a snuff-show in front of a live audience. His motivation lies in a crime of the past which scarred him for life. Maggie serves as the final girl of the film, accompanied by a heroic boyfriend. As to the identity of the killer, the film employs a suitable red herring for misdirection. Muir observes, however, that the film does not use slasher films themselves as part of its self-reflecting depiction of the horror genre. The characters don't seem aware of the relevant tropes, nor do they seem aware of their presence in a slasher film-like situation, unlike their counterparts in Scream and I Know What You Did Last Summer (1997).

The film includes a scene hinting at supernatural horror, which seems out of place in this film and is never properly explained. Suzanne, Maggie's mother, arrives at Dreamland to confront Lanyard Gates, gun in hand. As if in response, the letters of the movie theater's marquee fall on the ground and in their place appears a new sign: Possessor. No character in this film, including the killer, has the ability to do something like this.

Release

Box office 
The film was not a box office success. The film opened in 8th place its debut weekend with a tally of $2,563,365 from just over 1,000 screens. It ended its domestic box office run with $4,205,000.

Home media 
Popcorn was initially released on VHS in June 1991.  Variety reported in 1993 that home video sales equaled $2,043,179.

Elite Entertainment released a DVD edition of Popcorn in 2001. Special features include theatrical trailers, TV spots and promotional footage. This release is out-of-print and hard to find.

A Region A (US/Canada) Blu-ray/DVD combo was released through Synapse Films on March 7, 2017.

Reception 

On review aggregator website Rotten Tomatoes the film reports that 38% of 21 critics gave the film positive reviews.  John Kenneth Muir identified two distinct films in Popcorn: one is a smart, postmodern film that "self-reflexively gazes back at genre conventions and gimmickry", and the other a rather derivative revival of 1980s slashers that lacks the self-awareness and intelligence of the more postmodern half.  Vincent Canby of The New York Times called it "the best spoof of its kind since Alligator."  Kevin Thomas of the Los Angeles Times called it an "ingenious and spoofy little shocker" and "A Nifty Tribute to Its Genre".  Owen Gleiberman of Entertainment Weekly rated it B and wrote, "Though it isn't even trying to scare you, this is a very nifty black-comic horror movie, one of the rare entries in the genre with some genuine wit and affection."  Richard Harrington of The Washington Post wrote that it "has several good ideas that, unfortunately, go unrealized."  Stephen Hunter of The Baltimore Sun wrote, "Popcorn isn't too clever by half, but only by seven-sixteenths. It's so busy being droll and ironic it forgets to be any good."  Chris Hicks of the Deseret News wrote, "On the whole, "Popcorn" is so amateurish in its  development, with pseudo-hip dialogue that drops movie references every few  lines, it winds up being neither scary nor funny."  Gary Thompson of the Philadelphia Daily News wrote that the film spoofs were inspired, but the rest of the film is much worse.  Reviewing the 2001 DVD release, Adam Tyner of DVD Talk called it "a wildly entertaining movie", and Patrick Naugle of DVD Verdict called it "a fun little flick."

Sources

References

External links 
 
 
 

1991 films
1991 comedy films
1991 horror films
1990s comedy horror films
1991 directorial debut films
1991 independent films
1990s slasher films
American comedy horror films
American independent films
American slasher films
Slasher comedy films
Films scored by Paul Zaza
Films about insects
Films based on urban legends
Films directed by Mark Herrier
Films directed by Alan Ormsby
Films set in a movie theatre
Films set in California
Films shot in Jamaica
Giant monster films
American natural horror films
American serial killer films
American films about revenge
American exploitation films
American splatter films
1990s English-language films
1990s American films